David Henry "Dave" Wight (born July 28, 1934 in London, died November 9, 2017), was an American competition rower and Olympic champion.

He competed at the 1956 Summer Olympics in Melbourne, where he received a gold medal in eights with the American team.

References

1934 births
2017 deaths
Rowers from Greater London
English emigrants to the United States
American male rowers
Olympic gold medalists for the United States in rowing
Rowers at the 1956 Summer Olympics
Medalists at the 1956 Summer Olympics